Mimi Plange is a Ghanaian-born fashion designer. She moved as a child to America, where she studied architecture and fashion.

Early life
Plange was born in Accra, Ghana. She moved to California with her family when she was young. She received a BA in Architecture from the University of California at Berkeley and attended the Fashion Institute of Design and Merchandising in California. After her education she moved to New York and worked for both Patricia Fields and Rachel Roy.

She and her business partner, Ibrahim Ndoye, created a fashion line Boudoir D'huîtres but she later changed it to her own name Mimi Plange in 2010.

Her designs are influenced by African heritage. Her customers have included Rihanna, Serena Williams and first Lady Michelle Obama. Michelle wore her A-line skirt on the ABC TV show The View. Plange was the Designer of the Year at Mercedes Benz Fashion Week South Africa.

In a 2011 article in The New York Times, Plange was quoted as stating: "I want to prove to people that African fashion can't be pigeonholed.... I can compete globally." Plange does not use traditional African prints or textiles in her designs. In her Spring 2012 collection, Scarred Perfection, she referenced the body scars that Africans would use as a mode of tribal identification. Plange explains, "I am motivated by those things that make us question how we represent ourselves to other people."

In 2015, she collaborated with furniture designers Roche Bobois to create Mahjong tiles and sofas dressed with her materials that were made in Burkina Faso.

References 

21st-century African-American people
21st-century African-American women
African-American fashion designers
American fashion designers
American women fashion designers
Ghanaian emigrants to the United States
Ghanaian fashion designers
Ghanaian women fashion designers
High fashion brands
Living people
People from California
Year of birth missing (living people)